Henrietta Bell Wells (October 11, 1912 – February 27, 2008) was the first female member of the debate team at historically black Wiley College in Texas. She was born Henrietta Pauline Bell on the banks of Buffalo Bayou in Houston, Texas to a West Indian single mother.

During her year on the team, Wiley beat some of the top historically black colleges including Tuskegee University and Howard University. They also made history by participating in the first college debate between white and African American students in 1930 when they debated students from the Law School at the University of Michigan. Despite the team's success, Ms. Bell was only able to participate on the debate team for one year because financial pressures forced her to work in order to continue her education.

Bell married fellow Episcopalian Rev. Wallace L. Wells and went on to be a social worker and teacher in Gary, Indiana; Houston, Texas; Birmingham, Alabama,  and New Orleans, Louisiana. Their assignment in Gary, Indiana included the building of architecturally significant St. Augustine's Episcopal Church (Gary, Indiana). Mrs. Wells served as the Dean of Women at Dillard University in New Orleans. She died 27 February 2008 in Baytown, Texas.

The character Samantha Booke in the 2007 movie, The Great Debaters, played by Jurnee Smollett, was loosely based on Wells. Wells stated that she had told Denzel Washington, who directed the film, to also play her team's coach, Melvin B. Tolson, in the film.

Bell died on February 27, 2008, aged 95, and is buried in Paradise North Cemetery in Houston, Texas.

References

Sources
Ihde, Carlton. "The Battle of Builders - Tradition Vs.  Modern", Chicago Daily News, November 10, 1956: 12. Print. 
Dart, Susan. Edward Dart Architect. Evanston: Evanston Publishing, 1993. Print. .
Wells, Wallace L. "Prayerful and Militant", The Living Church 140.3 (1960): 12. Print.

External links
 

1912 births
2008 deaths
American social workers
Dillard University faculty
Wiley College alumni
People from Gary, Indiana
People from Houston
African-American Episcopalians
20th-century American Episcopalians
20th-century African-American people
Competitive debaters